Dolphin Hotel may refer to:

 Dolphin Hotel, Southampton, England
 Walt Disney World Dolphin, a hotel in Florida
 Dolphin Hotel, a pub in Surry Hills, New South Wales, Australia
 Dolphin Hotel, Romsey, a Grade II* listed building in Test Valley, England
 Dolphin Hotel, a fictional location in Steven King's 1408 short story and the film

See also

 Dolphin Inn, Plymouth
Pub names#Dolphin